Naval Base Adelaide was a United States Navy base at Adelaide and Port Adelaide, South Australia, Australia during World War II. Northern Australian ports were within reach of Japanese long-range bombers. The bombing of Darwin on February 19, 1942, demonstrated that a more southern port was needed, with Adelaide, in southern Australia, being distant from the possibility of any current or future attacks. The existing port facilities at Adelaide were large enough to support the staging of future actions. Local civilians were hired to help in the unloading and loading of US Navy, US Army and Merchant Navy ships.

History
Protected by Fort Largs, Port Adelaide was an Army staging port from May 1942 to July 1942, with depots supplying the 32nd Division of the United States Army.  Camps were built  from the Port of Adelaide. Japan planned an invasion of Australia, but after their losses at the Battle of the Coral Sea, Japan canceled these plans. In 1944 use of the distant Port of Adelaide lessened as newer bases closer to the action were built. After the war, the US Navy and Army bases were closed.

Adelaide Convoys 
Regular convoys were numbered, with the code letter prefix "CO" being used for the Newcastle to Melbourne and Adelaide run, from June 1942 to December 1943, with 150 convoys; the reverse trip had the code prefix "OC".
The first CO convoy was CO.1, and departed on June 8, 1942. Ships in the convoy included: British Age, British Allara, George M. Livanos, New Zealand MV Hauraki, British Iron Baron, British Macedon, British Meroo, British Scottish Chief, Greek Theofano Livanos and Norwegian Vito, escorted by Australian destroyer HMAS Arunta and corvette/minesweeper HMAS Kalgoorlie.  The last convoy was CO.149, which departed December 4, 1943 with ships: British Barrosa, British Helen Moller, Yugoslav Olga Topic, British Wear, and US Wilbur Wright, escorted by Australian corvette/minesweeper HMAS Ballarat and auxiliary patrol vessel HMAS Wilcannia.
Some ships that ported at Adelaide: USS Ancon, USS Briareus, SS America, MV Duntroon, MS West Honaker, and the SS President Taft,

Terowie railway station

Terowie railway station, 217 km north of the Port of Adelaide, became the main transfer point for staging troops and supplies.  A US Army camp was built at Terowie. All that remains of the camp is the six concrete prison cells. The Terowie railway station is known for General Douglas MacArthur making his first “I Shall Return” speeches there on March 20, 1942.

Supply depot
The US Army set up a supply depot, Base Section 5, outside of Adelaide. The depot was run by the 84th Ordnance for the 32nd Division. The depot supplied remote advance bases. Due to port limitations, the depots were set up inland, and rail lines and trucks were used to move supplies.

South Australian airfields
Both the US Navy and US Army used some of the nearby Australian Airfields:
Ceduna Airfield, now Ceduna Airport
Gawler Airfield, now Gawler Aerodrome
Kingscote Airfield, now Kingscote Airport
Mallala Airfield, RAAF Base Mallala; now defunct
Mount Gambier Airfield, now Mount Gambier Airport
Oodnadatta Airfield, now Oodnadatta Airport
Parafield Airfield (Adelaide Airfield), now Parafield Airport 
Port Lincoln Airfield, now Port Lincoln Airport
Port Pirie Airfield, now Port Pirie Airport

Post war
South Australian Aviation Museum at Port Adelaide
Whyalla Maritime Museum at Whyalla
General Douglas MacArthur Monument at Terowie
National War Memorial (South Australia)
Plaques United States Servicemen, Text on the plaques, located in the Adelaide Botanic Garden: at 
In deep gratitude to the men and women of the United States of America who joined in the defense of Australia during the war of 1939 - 1945

See also

Eastern Area Command (RAAF)
HM Naval Dockyard Williamstown
US Naval Advance Bases

Notes 
a:. New Zealand-registered MV Hauraki was captured by Japanese armed merchant cruiser Aikoku Maru near Ceylon, 12 July 1942.

b:. Possibly SS Barossa

c:. For SS Wilbur Wright, see List of Liberty ships (S–Z)

References

External links
youtube  MaCarthur In Australia (1942)

Flickr gallery
Johnny's Pages gallery

Military installations established in 1942
Closed installations of the United States Navy
1942 in Australia
Naval Base Adelaide